Babadağ in Denizli Province is one of two mountains in Turkey with the same name, which translates into English as  "Father Mountain". The other Babadağ mountain is in Muğla Province on the Aegean Sea. Both are part of the Taurus Mountains. The summit of the Babadağ in Denizli Province is located 23 km away in southwestern direction from Denizli, the capital of the province. 

The summit of Babadağ is covered by snow yearlong.

On the northern slope of the mountain − at an altitude of about 800 m − is the town Babadağ named after the mountain.

The area is characterized by the existence of geological fault zones, which have contributed in the past to the occurrence of many landslides. The high risk of landslides in conjunction with seismic activity has led to the evacuation of a substantial part of the town of Babadağ in 2006 and to a relocation of many of the former inhabitants to the Denizli.

Photographs 

Babadağ
Landforms of Denizli Province